Ha Seok-ju (born February 20, 1968) is a South Korean football manager and former player. Ha was one of the few left-footed South Korean players at the time.

International career
He played for the South Korea national football team, and was a participant in 1994 and 1998 FIFA World Cup. In the 1998 World Cup, he played the first game against Mexico, scoring the opener with a free kick. However, he was sent off for an ill-advised tackle three minutes after his goal. South Korea conceded three goals after his exit. He also could not play the game against the Netherlands due to the punishment for his red card, and South Korea lost 5–0 during his absence. He came back for the last game against Belgium, assisting Yoo Sang-chul's equaliser with a free kick again. He contributed to all of South Korea's two goals in the 1998 World Cup, but couldn't avoid accusations in his country. He was also feeling guilty towards the manager Cha Bum-kun, who was sacked from the national team in the middle of the tournament, and so he avoided Cha for 20 years.

Career statistics

Club

International 

Results list South Korea's goal tally first.

Honours

Player 
Ajou University
 Korean National Championship runner-up: 1986

Daewoo Royals B
 Korean National Championship: 1990

Daewoo Royals
 K League 1: 1991, 1997
 Korean League Cup: 1997, 1997+

Pohang Steelers
 Korean FA Cup runner-up: 2001, 2002

South Korea
 AFC Asian Cup third place: 2000

Individual
 Korean National Championship Most Valuable Player: 1990
 Korean National Championship top goalscorer: 1990
 K League 1 Best XI: 1996
 World XI: 1997
 AFC Asian All Stars: 1997

Entertainer

References

External links
 
 Ha Seok-ju – National Team Stats at KFA 
 
 

 International Appearances & Goals

1968 births
Living people
Association football midfielders
South Korean footballers
South Korean expatriate footballers
South Korea international footballers
Busan IPark players
Cerezo Osaka players
Vissel Kobe players
Pohang Steelers players
K League 1 players
J1 League players
Expatriate footballers in Japan
1994 FIFA World Cup players
1998 FIFA World Cup players
2000 AFC Asian Cup players
2001 FIFA Confederations Cup players
Footballers at the 1996 Summer Olympics
Olympic footballers of South Korea
Sportspeople from South Gyeongsang Province
South Korean expatriate sportspeople in Japan
Jeonnam Dragons managers
Ajou University alumni
South Korean football managers
Footballers at the 1994 Asian Games
Asian Games competitors for South Korea